The 2017 Coleman Vision Tennis Championships was a professional tennis tournament played on outdoor hard courts. It was the twentieth edition of the tournament and was part of the 2017 ITF Women's Circuit. It took place in Albuquerque, United States, on 18–24 September 2017.

Singles main draw entrants

Seeds 

 1 Rankings as of 11 September 2017.

Other entrants 
The following players received a wildcard into the singles main draw:
  Kayla Day
  Quinn Gleason
  Sanaz Marand

The following players received entry from the qualifying draw:
  Megan McCray
  Amanda Rodgers
  Sabrina Santamaria
  Zuzana Zlochová

The following player received entry as a lucky loser:
  Ksenia Laskutova

Champions

Singles

 Emina Bektas def.  Maria Sanchez, 6–4, 6–2

Doubles
 
 Tara Moore /  Conny Perrin def.  Viktorija Golubic /  Amra Sadiković, 6–3, 6–3

External links 
 2017 Coleman Vision Tennis Championships at ITFtennis.com
 Official website 

2017 ITF Women's Circuit
2017 in American tennis
Tennis tournaments in the United States
Tennis in New Mexico